Jeanette White (born May 2, 1943) is an American politician. A Democrat, she has served in the Vermont Senate from the Windham district since 2003.

Biography 
White was born on May 2, 1943, in Thief River Falls, Minnesota. White moved to Vermont in 1972. She currently lives in Putney, Vermont with her husband, Bill White. They have two grown children, Laurie and Josh.

White received a bachelor's degree in 1965 from the University of Iowa in Iowa City in political science and sociology. She earned a master's degree in 1972 from Southern Illinois University, Carbondale,  in Community Development and Community Education.

State Senator 
White serves as the Chair of the Senate Committee on Government Operations.  She is also a member of the Committee on the Judiciary and the Government Accountability Committee. White is one of three state senators serving on the Judicial Nominating Board.

References

1943 births
Living people
People from Thief River Falls, Minnesota
Democratic Party Vermont state senators
Women state legislators in Vermont
21st-century American politicians
21st-century American women politicians